The Australian Chiropractors Association (ACA), founded in 1990 as the Chiropractors' Association of Australia (CAA), is the largest association of chiropractors and chiropractic students in Australia. Following a restructure of the Association into a single entity in May 2018, the name was changed to the Australian Chiropractors Association.

Chiropractic has been widely discredited by mainstream academia and is regarded as pseudoscience and a form of complementary and alternative medicine.

Mission
The ACA's stated mission is to provide leadership and facilitate unity and excellence within the profession, and to assist members in delivering patient centred, holistic, natural, competent and effective health care. The ACA also claims to engage with stakeholders including governments, academic institutions, media, and the public as well as facilitate and promote communication between members and non-members. They further state they wish to develop and promote chiropractic practice, education, and research as well as set and maintain standards of care.

Controversy
In 2015, the President-elect of the ACA, Dr Helen Alevanki, resigned after making numerous visits to the maternity ward of an undisclosed hospital in Victoria to perform chiropractic on newborn babies. Her resignation was accepted by the board. An investigation by the AHPRA found that Dr Alevanki entered the premises of the hospital without the permission of the facility. She was not stripped of her registration as a Chiropractor.

References

External links

Tebby Chiropractic & Sports Medicine Clinic

Chiropractic organizations
National Rural Health Alliance organisations
Health care industry trade groups based in Australia